Zavolzhsky District is an administrative and municipal district (raion), one of the twenty-one in Ivanovo Oblast, Russia. It is located in the north of the oblast. Its administrative center is the town of Zavolzhsk. Population:   22,039 (2002 Census);  The population of Zavolzhsk accounts for 68.9% of the district's total population.

Administrative and municipal status
The town of Zavolzhsk serves as the administrative center of the district. Prior to the adoption of the Law #145-OZ On the Administrative-Territorial Division of Ivanovo Oblast in December 2010, it was administratively incorporated separately from the district. Municipally, Zavolzhsk is incorporated within Zavolzhsky Municipal District as Zavolzhskoye Urban Settlement.

References

Notes

Sources

Districts of Ivanovo Oblast

